Greatest Hits is the first compilation album by American country music artist Jake Owen. It was released on November 24, 2017, via RCA Nashville. The album includes eleven previously released singles and two unreleased songs.

Track listing

Charts

References

2017 greatest hits albums
Jake Owen albums
Albums produced by Ross Copperman
Albums produced by Shane McAnally
Albums produced by Joey Moi
Albums produced by Jimmy Ritchey
RCA Records compilation albums